Rovna or Rovná may refer to the following places:

Czech Republic
Rovná (Pelhřimov District)
Rovná (Sokolov District)
Rovná (Strakonice District)

Bosnia and Herzegovina
 Rovna, Bosnia and Herzegovina